Tumabatu Island is an island located in Kaskazini A District of Lindi Region in Tanzania's Indian Ocean coast. In Tanzania, East Africa's Zanzibar Archipelago, Tumbatu is the third-largest island. The wedge-shaped Tumbatu island is only 2 kilometers (1.2 miles) wide and 8 kilometers (5.0 miles) long (the widest part is in the southern end). 
Unguja is a little bit isolated from the rest of Zanzibar despite having a southern side that is only 2 km (1.2 miles) long and surrounded by a reef from Mkokotoni on the island. Tumbati has two islets, Popo Island to the east and Mwana wa Mwana Island to the north. The Island is the native home of a sub cultural group of the Hadimu known as Tumbatu.

References

 Islands of Tanzania